St. Michael's Church, Tilehurst, is the parish church of Tilehurst in the English county of Berkshire. It is a parish of the Church of England in the Diocese of Oxford.

The church dates from the 12th century, although the oldest part of the current building is the south aisle, built round about 1300, now dedicated as the Lady Chapel. In the early 17th century, this aisle gained the addition of one of the most spectacular renaissance church monuments in the county. Dutch merchant and lord of the manor, Sir Peter Vanlore, lies with wife in heraldic splendour, accompanied by nine children.

The building was judged to need repair work by the 19th century, and was much restored in 1855 to designs by G. E. Street. This work included building the north aisle and adding a spire to the tower, which dates from the 1730s. The church was again altered in 1955, and an extension was completed in 1993, adding various rooms and the other facilities that are needed by a busy parish church.

References

External links

Royal Berkshire History: Tilehurst Church

Church of England church buildings in Berkshire
Diocese of Oxford
Grade II listed churches in Berkshire
St Michael